Sarper is a Turkish surname. Notable people with the surname include:

Ceren Sarper (born 1990), Turkish basketball player
Mehmet Sarper Kiskaç (born 1990), Turkish footballer
Selim Sarper (1899–1968), Turkish diplomat and politician

See also
Carper

Turkish-language surnames